XHRRF-FM 88.5 is a radio station in Conkal, Yucatán.

History
On June 8, 1962, two years after it signed on, XERRF-AM 1150 was awarded to Rafael Rivas Franco, the founder of Grupo Rivas, which still owns many radio stations in Mérida and Yucatán. The station was originally known as Radio Felicidad. In 1967, the station concession passed to Radio Peninsular, S.A., and again in 1997 to Radio Juvenil del Sureste, S.A. de C.V. Not long after, XERRF moved to 860, and soon after that, in the mid-2000s, it was sold to Grupo Radiodigital Siglo XXI, S.A. de C.V., which was in turn sold to Grupo Radio México. At some point thereafter, XERRF changed concessionaires.

On June 4, 2010, XERRF received permission to migrate to FM as XHRRF-FM 88.5.

In late 2020, Grupo Radio Centro transferred operations of XHRRF and XHYK to Peninsula Studios. Both stations received new formats, with XHRRF becoming "Arya FM" broadcasting an English-language pop format focused on music from the 1990s.

References

Radio stations in Yucatán
Grupo Radio Centro